Naluo or Naruo may refer to:

Naluo Yi language (Naluo, Laluo, Alu, Gan Yi)
Aluo language (Naluo, Gan Yi)